Sadio Doumbia and Fabien Reboul were the defending champions but lost in the semifinals to Filip Bergevi and Petros Tsitsipas.

Viktor Durasovic and Otto Virtanen won the title after defeating Bergevi and Tsitsipas 6–4, 6–4 in the final.

Seeds

Draw

References

External links
 Main draw

Brest Challenger - Doubles
2022 Doubles